Vice Admiral Rombault Mbuayama Nsiona is a Congolese military officer and, as of 2014, is the chief of naval staff in the armed forces of the Democratic Republic of the Congo (FARDC). In 2007 he was appointed as the FARDC chief of logistics, being a brigadier general at the time. However, before becoming the chief of naval staff, he had served as the commander of the 6th Military Region (Katanga Province), holding the rank of major general. Before 2007 he had also served as regional commander in Ituri and Bas-Congo.

References

|-

Democratic Republic of the Congo military personnel
Living people
Year of birth missing (living people)